Swimming at the 2003 South Pacific Games took place from 30 June to 7 July in Suva, the capital of Fiji.

The pool events were held on the first 6 days in the 50m (long-course) pool at Fiji's National Aquatics Centre, and a 3 kilometre ("3K") open water race was held at Pacific Harbour on Monday, July 7, 2003. Originally, a 5K open water race was to be contested – 5K being a more widely internationally accepted race distance than a 3K. However, rough conditions on-course pushed the turn markers/buoys out of position and the length of the race needed to be changed to accommodate the conditions.

Overall, Papua New Guinea's Ryan Pini (male) and New Caledonia's Diane Bui Duyet (female) were named "Swimmers of the Meet" for their overall performances: Pini won 7 events, 4 in record time and earned 12 medals overall; Bui-Duyet won 10 events with 5 games records, and 11 medals in total.

Event schedule

Monday, July 7: men's and women's 3,000m Open Water swim.

Results

Men

Women

Participating countries
101 swimmers from 9 countries took part in the swimming competitions at the 2003 South Pacific Games (team size in parentheses):

 (7)
 (17)
 (6)
 (30)
 (9)
 (4)
 (10)
 (6)
 (12)

References

External links
2003 South Pacific Games - Swimming: Schedule/Results; retrieved 2009-07-03.

2003 in swimming
Swimming at the Pacific Games
2003 South Pacific Games